Galder Cerrajería López (born 5 April 1989) is a Spanish professional footballer who plays for Cultural y Deportiva Leonesa as a central midfielder.

Club career
Born in Barakaldo, Biscay, Cerrajería spent three years at Athletic Bilbao's youth academy, then returned to the club in 2008 to represent both the farm team CD Basconia and the reserves, spending two full seasons with the latter in Segunda División B. In 2011–12 he was promoted to the Basques' main squad, but was loaned to Real Murcia in August.

Cerrajería made his debut with the Segunda División club against RC Celta de Vigo on 28 August 2011, playing 32 minutes in a 1–3 home loss. His contract with Athletic was mutually terminated in August 2012, and he signed with Real Oviedo shortly after. 

Cerrajería spent the vast majority of his remaining career in the third tier, mainly at the service of Barakaldo CF. In 2021, the 32-year-old achieved promotion to the second with Burgos CF.

References

External links

1989 births
Living people
Spanish footballers
Footballers from Barakaldo
Association football midfielders
Segunda División players
Segunda División B players
Tercera División players
CD Basconia footballers
Bilbao Athletic footballers
Athletic Bilbao footballers
Real Murcia players
Real Oviedo players
Burgos CF footballers
Barakaldo CF footballers
CD Mirandés footballers
Cultural Leonesa footballers